The Mühlsteinbrüche ("Millstone Quarries") south of Jonsdorf in the Zittau Mountains in Saxony are a region of bizarre rock formations, which have been formed by the quarrying of sandstone for millstones and also by weathering processes. They are a popular hiking and climbing area. An educational trail runs through the region which has an area of about 35 hectares.

Location and surrounding area 
The Mühlsteinbrüche are located south of Jonsdorf at a height of 480 to 560 metres. To the southwest they are adjoined by the Jonsdorfer Felsenstadt. About 600 metres to the south is the border with the Czech Republic.

Geology 

The sandstone in the Mühlsteinbrüche region was formed in the geological age of the Middle Turonian and, based on its formation, belongs to the Bohemian Cretaceous Basin. It is characterised by several special features. For example, the sandstone, which was formed by sedimentation, has been breached multiple times by basaltic and phonolitic intrusions as a result of contact with occurrences of Tertiary volcanism in North Bohemia. Often, in these cases, the rock has been exposed to thermal changes (contact with magma and hydrothermal fluids), which has led to vitrification of the rock (a melting of mineral grains at their grain boundaries). The sandstone retains its porosity, is hardened by the strength of its grain structure and thus its abrasion resistance is increased.

The area of Mühlsteinbrüche has as additional geological feature: its pronounced columnar sandstone. Its best known rock formation is the Große und Kleine Orgel ("Great and Little Organ"), whose appearance is easily confused with that of columnar basalt. The columns, which are completely atypical for sandstone, have a diameter of up to 15 centimetres and are bundled vertically on a solid, non-columnar sandstone block. They have been formed by thermal processes as a result of contact with magma. In 1852 Alexander von Humboldt sent an artist and two geologists here to study this phenomenon.

History 
The use of sandstone in the Zittau Mountains for the production of millstones was already under way from the 16th century. The Jonsdorf Mühlsteinbrüche were one of more than 40 quarrying sites in the surrounding region. In 1560, quarrying began in Jonsdorf itself. Over 350 years, sandstone was quarried here and made into millstones with a diameter of up to 2.70 metres. To do this, the millstones were initially hewn out of one piece of rock. From about 1850, millstones were assembled from several pieces as there were no longer any sufficiently large and homogeneous sandstone blocks being quarried. Production was maintained until 1918. The main markets were in Russia and England. Moscow and Saint Petersburg had their own offices for the millstone trade.
 
In the 1950s, a nature trail was laid out by friends of nature and local history. From 1990, a restoration of the quarries was begun in order to make them accessible. In 2002, a demonstration workshop was built in the Schwarzer Loch ("Black Hole"). Today the Mühlsteinbrüche are a major attraction in the Zittau Mountains.

Sights 

Rock formations:
Drei Tische, kidney-shaped sandstone rock formation, formed from iron oxide precipitation
Mausefalle ("Mousetrap"), a rock formation created by a rock collapse in 1908
Nashorn ("Rhino") and Bernhardiner
Große und Kleine Orgel ("Great and Little Organs")
Löwe ("Lion")
Humboldtfelsen ("Humboldt Rock"), a 7-metre-high basalt shaft in the Schwarzer Bruch ("Black Quarry")
Schnapslager
Rutsche ("Slide")
Old quarries
Bärloch ("Bear Cave")
Weißer Felsen ("White Rock")
Schwarzes Loch ("Black Hole") with its demonstration workshop and tunnel
Kellerbergbruch
Old Smithy:
 Steinbruchschmiede

Literature 
 Andreas Gerth: Geologische Exkursionen in der Oberlausitz und im Elbsandsteingebirge. Oberlausitzer Verlag Spitzkunnersdorf, 2006; 
 Meyers Naturführer Oberlausitz. Meyers Lexikonverlag Mannheim/Leipzig/Vienna/Zurich;

External links 
Mühlsteinbrüche webpage by the Jonsdorf Mountain Club

Grinding mills
Rock formations of Saxony
Zittau Mountains
Quarries in Germany
Görlitz (district)
Building stone